Newman Wachs Racing (also referred to as NWR) is an auto racing team owned by Eddie Wachs and, until his death, Paul Newman. NWR was based outside of Chicago in Mundelein, Illinois. Newman and Wachs met when they both competed in Can-Am series in the mid-1970s and over the years talked about joining forces to create a driver development race team. They formed a Champ Car Atlantic team for the 2006 season to meet their objectives. 

In 2009, John Edwards won the Atlantic Championship, beating teammate Jonathan Summerton in a tiebreaker.

For 2010, the team entered a SpeedSource-prepared Mazda RX-8 in the Rolex Sports Car Series GT class for Edwards and Adam Christodoulou.

In 2016, the team announced a return to open wheel racing in the U.S. F2000 National Championship.

Drivers

Atlantic Championship
2006: Joe D'Agostino (#34), Daniel Gaunt/Steve Ott (#35), J. R. Hildebrand (#36)
2007: Tõnis Kasemets (#34), J. R. Hildebrand (#36)
2008: Simona de Silvestro (#34), Jonathan Summerton (#36)
2009: John Edwards (Champion) (#36), Markus Niemelä (#1), Jonathan Summerton (#34)

Rolex Sports Car Series
2010: John Edwards, Adam Christodoulou

Results

Complete Atlantic Championship results
(key) (results in bold indicate pole position) (results in italics indicate fastest lap)

 1 Ott also competed in 4 races for Jensen MotorSport.
 2 Niemelä also competed in 8 races for Jensen MotorSport.
 3 Summerton also competed in 4 races for Genoa Racing.

See also
Newman/Haas Racing

References

External links
Newman Wachs Homepage
Atlantic Championship

American auto racing teams

Atlantic Championship teams
Formula Regional teams